There are annual world championship events in the sport of motorcycle speedway for individual riders - the Speedway Grand Prix - and for national teams - the Speedway World Cup. Each has a counterpart for riders under 21: the Speedway World Under 21 Championship and the Team Speedway Junior World Championship. A pairs event, the Speedway World Pairs Championship, ran until 1993.

In addition there are two Ice Speedway World Championships for individuals and teams.  The first Ice World Championships were held in 1966.

Another form of speedway on larger tracks takes place called Longtrack and there is a World Championship called the Individual Speedway Long Track World Championship. Since 1998 it has been a combination of grasstrack and longtrack

References 

 Speedway Champions

World